The Department of Social Services (DSS) is a department of the Government of Australia charged with the responsibility for national policies and programs that help deliver a strong and fair society for all Australians. The department develops and implements social policy.

The head of the department is the Secretary of the Department of Social Services, currently Ray Griggs, who reports to the Minister for Families and Social Services. Previously, the Minister for Social Services was Paul Fletcher  from 2018 to 2019. In the Turnbull Government, the ministers were assisted by the Assistant Minister for Disability Services, the Hon Jane Prentice  and the Assistant Minister for Multicultural Affairs, the Hon Craig Laundy .

The head office of the department is located in the Australian Capital Territory suburb of Greenway.

History
The department was formed by way of an Administrative Arrangements Order issued on 18 September 2013 and replaced the majority of the functions previously performed by the former Department of Families, Housing, Community Services and Indigenous Affairs (FaHCSIA); with the exception of Office of Indigenous Policy Coordination, that was transferred to the Department of the Prime Minister and Cabinet.

Operational activities
In an Administrative Arrangements Order made on 18 September 2013, the functions of the department were broadly classified into the following matters:

 Ageing research
Income security and support policies and programs for families with children, carers, the aged, people with disabilities and people in hardship
Income support policies for students and apprentices
Services for families with children, people with disabilities and carers
Services for older people, including their carers
Policy for and promotion of active ageing, other than employment policy
Community mental health
Community support services
Family relationship, Family and Children's Support Services
Social housing, rent assistance and homelessness
Child support policy
Housing affordability
Services to help people with disabilities obtain employment
Arrangements for the settlement of migrants and humanitarian entrants, other than migrant child and migrant adult education
Non-profit sector and volunteering
Multicultural affairs

Secretary of the Department
The Secretary of the Department Social Services is the head of the department, also known as the secretary of the level of Senior Executive Service Band 4 in the Australian Public Service as per the Public Service Act 1999.

See also

 Department of the Prime Minister and Cabinet
 List of Australian Commonwealth Government entities

References

External links
 Department of Social Services website

Social Services
Adoption in Australia
Australian
Housing in Australia
Public policy in Australia
Government agencies established in 2013
Social security in Australia